Etienne Jean Jornod (born 6 January 1953 in Neuchâtel, Switzerland) is a Swiss entrepreneur and manager. He is Chairman of the Board of Directors of the pharmaceutical and logistics group Galenica and the NZZ Mediengruppe.

Life and education
Etienne Jornod grew up in Neuchâtel as the eldest of six children in a family of doctors and completed an apprenticeship as a pharmacist in Biel. He studied business administration at the HEC Lausanne and graduated with a licentiate (lic. Oec). He continued his studies at the Stanford University in the United States (Senior Executive Program).

Career 
In 1975, he joined Galenica as a Junior Product Manager, leaving the company in 1978 to study business administration. He returned to the company in 1981 as Assistant to the Directorate General. He has been a member of the Directorate General since 1989, and from 1996 to 2011, he led Galencia‘s dual mandate as President and Delegate of the Board of Directors. Since 2012, he has been executive chairman of the board.

Since April 2013, he has also been Chairman of the Board of the NZZ-Mediengruppe. He succeeded Franz Steinegger, who had retired from the board after reaching the age for retirement.

Etienne Jornod holds other directorships, including President of Vifor Pharma AG and Vifor Fresenius Medical Care Renal Pharma AG, as well as a member of the Vaudoise Insurance Group. From 2008 to 2009 he was a member of the board of Publigroupe. He was also a directorial member of Alliance Boots.

In May 2020, Jornod stepped down as executive chairman of Vifor Pharma's board of directors after 25 years of service, and was named honorary chairman of the company that same month, after having previously been appointed Honorary Chairman of Galenica in 2017.

Personal life 
Etienne Jornod is in his second marriage, the father of four children, two of them from his first marriage. He lives in Muri bei Bern.

References

External links 
 Etienne Jornod Website of Galenica
 Beat Gygi, Rainer Stadler: Von oben bis unten unternehmerisch denken. Interview Neue Zürcher Zeitung 16 April 2013
 Markus Spillmann: ''Wir sind dem Qualitätsjournalismus verpflichtet." Interview Neue Zürcher Zeitung 26 November 2013

Business executives
Swiss businesspeople
20th-century Swiss businesspeople
21st-century Swiss businesspeople
1953 births
Living people